Peter Eric Arnell (born April 22, 1958) is an American designer and branding executive, author, photographer, and founder of Arnell Group. He is known for creating  products, brands and campaigns for companies including Chrysler, PepsiCo., Reebok, Donna Karan and Unilever, and he has written extensively on architectural theory and art history.

Early life and education 
Arnell was born in Sheepshead Bay, Brooklyn.  His father, who changed the family name from Abraben to Arnell, was a mechanical engineer. His grandfather, a Russian immigrant, was a fishmonger; as a child, Arnell sometimes accompanied him to work at the Fulton Fish Market.

Arnell studied architecture at Brooklyn Technical High School.  He graduated in 1976.

Career 
Arnell started his career as an intern working for Michael Graves. There he met Ted Bickford, and the two collaborated on a series of books about artists and architects before forming Arnell-Bickford in the early 1980s.

Bergdorf Goodman fashion director Dawn Mello hired Arnell-Bickford to create ads for Bergdorf, and they later worked on in-store designs and promotions for Donna Karan's new clothing line. During his work for Donna Karan, Arnell created DKNY and its signature style, first with a black-and-white photograph of the Brooklyn Bridge, and later with DKNY's logo featuring the Statue of Liberty and the Manhattan skyline.

By 1985, the agency's income reached $4.4 million per year, with clients including Anne Klein, Bank of America, Chanel, Condé Nast, Consolidated Edison, Ray-Ban, Rockport and Tommy Hilfiger.

In 1993, Bickford left the company and Arnell renamed it Arnell Group.

Arnell partnered with architect Frank Gehry on projects such as the Brooklyn Arena and the Sentosa resort and aquarium between 2006-2010.

In early 2000, Arnell sold a 55% stake in Arnell Group to Draft Worldwide, and the firm became AG Worldwide. Shortly after in 2001, Arnell bought back his shares from Draft and sold the entire firm to Omnicom Group (NYSE:OMC). In 2008, AG was hired to redesign the logo for Pepsi and Tropicana. For both companies, Arnell wanted to "evolve [it] to a more modern state" but both rebrands were scrapped by the companies after being poorly received by consumers.

He remained Chairman and Chief Creative Officer until 2011, when he left Omnicom under disputes with the company which were then settled in 2012.

Arnell founded Intellectual Capital Investments (ICI) in New York City in 2011. In 2013, Arnell worked closely with former Prime Minister Thaksin Shinawatra to create ThaiWorks for SMEs (small and medium enterprises), artisans and OTOP's of Thailand. He has also worked with GNC, Digicel, Fontainebleau Resorts and Lowe’s Home Improvement.

In 2014, Arnell's photography was showcased in Milk Gallery in New York City.

Community service 
Arnell created the identity and graphics for the Council of Fashion Designers of America's "Fashion for Haiti" fundraising drive after the earthquake in 2010, and the charity shirt "Fashion for America," which raised $2 million dollars for the 9/11 Twin Towers Fund in 2001.He designed the 9/11 Tribute Museum's exhibit to commemorate the rescue workers.

Arnell has worked with the New York City Fire Department (FDNY) and the FDNY Foundation on safety campaigns.

Publications 
Arnell has written, edited and contributed to over 20 additional publications in architecture, art history, photography and branding.

His works include:
Shift:How to Reinvent Your Business, Your Career, and Your Personal Brand (Random House 2010)
Gucci:The Making of (Rizzoli 2011)
O Wonderful, Wonderful and Most Wonderful, Wonderful! And Yet Again Wonderful--: Portraits of Our U.S. Olympic Hopefuls (Sidney Press, 1991)
Peter Arnell Portfolio 1980-2020 (Hatje Cantz 2020)

Selected awards and recognition
Several of Arnell's ads and campaigns have won awards, including:

2003: Cannes Gold Lion for Best in Category – “Terry Tate, Office Linebacker”

2007: Ellis Island Medal of Honor

References

Branding consultants
1958 births
Living people